PT Bank OCBC NISP Tbk (formerly Bank NISP) is an Indonesian publicly listed banking and financial services company headquartered in South Jakarta, Indonesia. The bank is owned by Singaporean banking and financial group, OCBC Bank, which holds 85.1% of shares. OCBC NISP is Indonesia's 8th largest bank by assets and has 337 branches and offices and 780 ATMs located across the country.

History
Established in 1941, the bank was founded as NV Nederlandsch Indische Spaar en Deposito Bank ("Netherlands Indies Savings and Deposito Bank") in Bandung, then Dutch East Indies. The bank was one of the largest savings bank at the time of establishment and in 1967, it became a commercial bank providing corporate banking services as well. In 1981, the bank was then renamed to PT Bank Nilai Inti Sari Penyimpan (Bank NISP). It was among the first banks in Indonesia selected to channel government subsidized credits, to participate in government saving programs, and to issue bank guarantees for government projects. In 1972, Bank NISP entered into a joint agreement with Daiwa Perdania Bank, a joint venture between Daiwa Bank of Japan and Indonesian partners. Bank NISP later became a shareholder of Daiwa Perdania Bank. The bank subsequently became a licensed foreign exchange bank in 1990, and a publicly listed bank on the Indonesian Stock Exchange in 1994.

1997 to 2008: Joint venture and acquisition by OCBC
In 1997, Bank NISP entered a joint venture with OCBC Indonesia, with the opening of PT Bank OCBC-NISP, with an initial paid-up capital of 150 billion rupiah. Since then, OCBC has been buying shares from shareholders within the bank and also from President Director and CEO, Parwati Surjaudaja, who sold 22.5% of her shares to OCBC in 2004. By 2008, OCBC Bank had become the main shareholder in Bank NISP and the bank was renamed Bank OCBC NISP.

2010 to present: Merger with OCBC Indonesia
In 2011, OCBC NISP merged with OCBC Indonesia, where OCBC Indonesia was dissolved without going through liquidation. The combined entity would operate under the name of Bank OCBC NISP, and a total of Rp 47.6 trillion in combined assets after the merger.

Banking services

Individual Customers 
 Saving
 Consumer credit
 Credit card
 Bancassurrance
 Mutual funds
 Premier Service
 Private banking services
 Trust service
 Electronic banking services

Business Customers 
 Cash management
 Productive financing
 Trade finance
 Trust services
 Electronic banking services

Treasury 
 Foreign exchange and derivatives
 Debt securities
 Interest rate derivatives
 Structured product

Sharia Banking 

 Sharia funding
 Sharia retail financing
 Sharia productive financing
 Sharia Bancassurance

Management structure

Board of Commissioners 

 President Commissioner             : Maulana Trisno
 Commissioner                             : Supriadi Trisno
 Commissioner                             : Alkian Trisno
 Independent Commissioner        : Jusuf Halim
 Independent Commissioner        : Kwan Chiew Choi
 Independent Commissioner        : Hardi Juganda
 Independent Commissioner        : Betti S. Alisjahbana
 Independent Commissioner        : Rama P. Kusumaputra

Board of Directors 

 President Director                       : Supriadi Trisno
 Director                                       : Maulana Trisno
 Director                                       : M Alkian Trisno
 Director                                       : Arief Trisno
 Director                                       : Andrae Krishnawan W.
 Director                                       : Johannes Husin
 Director                                       : Low Seh Kiat
 Director                                       : Joseph Chan Fook Onn
 Director                                       : Lili S. Budiana
 Director                                       : Ka Jit

Sharia Supervisory Board 

 Chairperson                                : Muhammad Anwar Ibrahim
 Member                                      : Mohammad Bagus Teguh Perwira

See also

 List of banks in Indonesia
 OCBC Wing Hang Bank

References

External links
Official website
OCBC Bank website

Banks of Indonesia
Banks established in 1941
Companies listed on the Indonesia Stock Exchange
1941 establishments in Indonesia
1994 initial public offerings
Indonesian brands
OCBC Bank